Pure Love is a 2014 Philippine television drama series based on the 2011 South Korean drama series 49 Days. The series was aired on ABS-CBN's Primetime Bida evening block from July 7, 2014, to November 14, 2014, replacing Mirabella.

Cast and characters

Main cast
 Alex Gonzaga as Diane Santos
 Yen Santos as Ysabel Espiritu / Diane Santos (possessed) / Joan Viernes / Danica Santos
 Joseph Marco as Dave Martinez, Jr.
 Matt Evans as Scheduler / Jake Espiritu
 Arjo Atayde as Raymond dela Cruz / Ramon Esguerra
 Arron Villaflor as Ronald Trinidad
 Yam Concepcion as Kayla Santos
 Anna Luna as Jackie Cortez

Supporting cast
 Sunshine Cruz as Lorraine Santos
 John Arcilla as Peter Santos
 Dante Ponce as Jun Bautista
 Ana Capri as Juliet
 Bart Guingona as Danny
 Sylvia Sanchez as Ramona Esguerra
 Tetchie Agbayani as Señora
 Shey Bustamante as Cathy
 Sue Prado as Sally
 Ricardo Cepeda as Mr. Chua
 Jason Francisco as Frank

Guest cast
 Art Acuña as Dave Martinez, Sr.
 Nonie Buencamino as Jake's Scheduler
 Michael Flores as Arnulfo Navarro
 Minco Fabregas as Atty. Samson
 Menggie Cobarrubias† as Dr. James Young
 Helga Krapf as Diane's classmate
 Jacob Benedicto as Diane's classmate
 Hiyasmin Neri as Felicity
 Dionne Monsanto as Chelly
 Jed Montero as Cher
 Maila Gumila as Evangeline Martinez
 Miko Raval as Dr. Steve Ramos
 Gilleth Sandico as spiritualist

Soundtrack
 Gisingin ang Puso - Aiza Seguerra
 Magkabilang Mundo - Maki Ricafort
 Sundo - Johnoy Danao

Reception

See also
List of programs broadcast by ABS-CBN
List of ABS-CBN drama series

References

ABS-CBN drama series
Philippine drama television series
Fantaserye and telefantasya
2014 Philippine television series debuts
2014 Philippine television series endings
Philippine television series based on South Korean television series
Filipino-language television shows
Television shows set in Manila